Rear Admiral Sir William Saltonstall Wiseman, 8th Baronet KCB (4 August 1814 – 14 July 1874) was a British naval officer.

Naval career 
Born the son of Captain Sir William Saltonstall Wiseman, 7th Baronet, and his wife Catherine Mackintosh, daughter of Sir James Mackintosh, Wiseman entered the Royal Naval College in Portsmouth in 1827. He was made a lieutenant in 1838. In 1854 he was asked to convey Sir Hamilton Seymour, British Ambassador to Russia, to Saint Petersburg. Promoted to Captain in 1854, he was given command of HMS Penelope in 1855. He was appointed Commander-in-Chief, Australia Station, in 1863 and fought in the Waikato Campaign.

He was found dead in his lodgings in Saint Joseph, Missouri, on 14 July 1874.

Family
On 25 October 1838 he married Charlotte Jane Paterson, daughter of Admiral Charles William Paterson. They had a son and a daughter:

 Rear-Admiral Sir William Wiseman, 9th Baronet (1845–1893), naval officer, whose son was Sir William Wiseman, 10th Baronet, head of Secret Intelligence Service in Washington, DC, during the First World War.
 Eliza who married Admiral H. M. Alexander.

See also
 
 European and American voyages of scientific exploration

References 

1814 births
1874 deaths
Royal Navy admirals
Royal Navy personnel of the New Zealand Wars
Baronets in the Baronetage of England
Knights Commander of the Order of the Bath